Jerry King (born 1956) is a Wisconsin-based composer and multi-instrumentalist primarily known for his guitar and bass work with progressive rock bands Cloud Over Jupiter, Moon Men, and Moon X. He has collaborated with many other well-known artists including writer John Shirley; drummers Ric Parnell, Pete Thompson; guitarists Richie Castellano, Pete Prown, Ron Anderson; and is an active session musician.

History
King first formed the Central Wisconsin rock group called Zany Starblaster in 1977. The band played rock stages all about the U.S. Midwest through 1980 when the band tired of the road work and dissolved. Studio and live recordings of the group surfaced later and King released the best of the tracks in 2019.

For influences, King told It's Psychedelic Baby! Magazine, "In the early days I listened to a lot of Grand Funk Railroad. Their first three albums were critical in my learning. The first album by the band Soup, from the early 70’s, was another main inspiration. And Jack Casady from Jefferson Airplane and Hot Tuna as well. When I started out with the 6 string guitar, everything was Jimi Hendrix and Eric Clapton in Cream, and attempting to emulate their guitar playing. I would listen to a lot of bands like Yes, Emerson Lake & Palmer, King Crimson, Todd Rundgren, Blue Öyster Cult, Flash, Roxy Music, Be Bop Deluxe, Led Zeppelin, Black Sabbath, Genesis, Captain Beyond, Jukka Tolonen, Focus, Gentle Giant and a bit later discovered bands like Gong, Gilgamesh and Brand X."

Recordings
He traveled around the US for the next decade until he finally settled again in Wisconsin, where he formed several bands which performed regularly. In 2013 he built his studio and proceeded to work on all new original material that later was released under his band name, Cloud Over Jupiter.

King told Progression magazine, “One thing leads to another; it’s an expanding spider web of communication,” King says. “The threads are many. We’re all scratching each others’ backs via phone, Internet file-sharing and Skype! It's a family of artists who have the same vision, pretty much. I would say we believe in music that promotes Rock In Opposition, experimentation, progressive rock and jazz. That basically is where we’re coming from.”

Projects
Cloud Over Jupiter is King's main outlet for his compositions and he continues to release new albums regularly. His wife, Michele King, (vocals, piano and clarinet) has been a consistent band member. Moon Men formed in 2017 with the Muffin's founder and multi-instrumentalist Dave Newhouse, drummer Bill Jungwirth, and experimental guitarist Bret Harold Hart. They recorded five albums of all original music until the band folded in 2021.

Newhouse and King continued as a trio with Newhouse's son, George, on drums, calling themselves Moon X. One album has been released to date in 2022. In 2018 King collaborated with horror and fantasy writer, John Shirley, on one album of music. Shirley has also appeared on the Cloud Over Jupiter album, Short Stories For Tall Aliens.

Partial discography

Cloud Over Jupiter
 5th Mass From the Sun (2015)
 Short Stories For Tall Aliens (with John Shirley) (2019)
 They're Here With Us...Not For Us (2021)

Moon Men
 Amazing Science-Fiction Stories (2017)
 Uncomfortable Space Probe (2018)
 3 (2019)
 3.5 The EP (2019)
 Tales of the Space Pirates (2020)

John Shirley
 Spaceship Landing in a Cemetery (2018)

Moon X
 Zap! (2022)

With others
 Zany Starblaster – The Lost Tapes (2019)
 Jerry King and Bret Hart – Oblique Observations (2021)	
 Frets of Yore – A Collection of Guitart Pieces for the Immediate Past (compilation with various artists) (2017)
 Diratz – Diratz (2017)
 Manna Mirage – Rest of the World (2018)
 Oval Planet – Trench Poems (2019)
 Manna Mirage – Face (2020)
 Gates of Oktober – "Guilty Man" and “Malathion” (2020) [singles]
 There Is No Time – self titled album, (2021)
 Manna Mirage – Man Out of Time (2021)
 Pete Prown and Friends – The Fusion Tapes (2021)
 Gordon * Prown * King - Moorish Code (2021)
 Refestramus – Decoupage (2021)

References

1956 births
Guitarists from Wisconsin
Living people